Joe Tracy (March 22, 1873 – March 20, 1959) was a racing driver born in Waterford, Ireland who emigrated to the United States at age 19 and became an American citizen. He drove a Locomobile in the 1905 Gordon Bennett Cup but was eliminated by a stripped gear after two laps and later competed in that year's Vanderbilt Cup race, finishing 3rd, the best result for an American car in an international race at the time. He retired from racing shortly after the 1906 racing season where he had good finishes in both the Vanderbilt and Bennett Cups. He was retroactively awarded the 1906 National Championship in 1951.

External links
Dennis David GP History - Joe Tracy Bio 
Vanderbilt Cup Race - Joe Tracy Bio

1873 births
1959 deaths
American racing drivers
Irish racing drivers
People from Waterford (city)